Chamalycaeus is a genus of tropical land snails  with an operculum, terrestrial gastropod mollusks in the family Alycaeidae.

Species
, WoRMS records the following species in this genus:
 Chamalycaeus andamaniae (Benson, 1861)
 Chamalycaeus armillatus (Benson, 1856)
 Chamalycaeus busbyi (Godwin-Austen, 1893)
 Chamalycaeus canaliculatus (Möllendorff, 1894)
 Chamalycaeus celebensis (Martens, 1891)
 Chamalycaeus everetti (Godwin-Austen, 1889)
 Chamalycaeus excisus (Möllendorff, 1887)
 Chamalycaeus expanstoma Minato, 1982
 Chamalycaeus fruhstorferi (Möllendorff, 1897)
 Chamalycaeus kessneri Vermeulen, 1996
 Chamalycaeus microconus (Möllendorff, 1887)
 Chamalycaeus mixtus Zilch, 1957
 Chamalycaeus miyazakii Takahashi & Habe, 1973
 Chamalycaeus nagaensis (Godwin-Austen, 1871)
 Chamalycaeus oglei (Godwin-Austen, 1914)
 Chamalycaeus perplexus (Godwin-Austen, 1914)
 Chamalycaeus rarus Páll-Gergely & Auffenberg, 2019
 Chamalycaeus reinhardti (Mörch, 1872)
 Chamalycaeus reticulatus (Möllendorff, 1897)
 Chamalycaeus richthofeni (W. T. Blanford, 1863)
 Chamalycaeus sculptilis (Benson, 1856)
 Chamalycaeus specus (Godwin-Austen, 1889)
 Chamalycaeus subfossilis (P. Sarasin & F. Sarasin, 1899)
 Chamalycaeus sumatranus (Martens, 1900)
 Chamalycaeus takahashii Habe, 1976
 Chamalycaeus tanghali (Godwin-Austen, 1914)
 Chamalycaeus troglodytes (B. Rensch, 1934)
 Chamalycaeus vulcani (W. T. Blanford, 1863)
 Chamalycaeus yanoshigehumii Minato, 1987

References

External links

 
Alycaeidae
Taxonomy articles created by Polbot